Erion Sula (born 2 November 1986 in Lushnjë) is an Albanian footballer who most recently played as a defender for Tomori Berat in the Albanian First Division.

References

1986 births
Living people
Sportspeople from Lushnjë
Association football defenders
Albanian footballers
KS Kastrioti players
KS Lushnja players
KS Shkumbini Peqin players
FK Tomori Berat players
Kategoria Superiore players
Kategoria e Parë players